Mario Cipriani (29 May 1909 – 10 June 1944) was an Italian racing cyclist. He won stage 6 of the 1933 Giro d'Italia. He was killed in a bombing raid during World War II.

References

External links
 

1909 births
1944 deaths
Italian male cyclists
Italian Giro d'Italia stage winners
Place of birth missing
Italian civilians killed in World War II
Deaths by airstrike during World War II
Sportspeople from the Province of Prato
Cyclists from Tuscany